Antonio Landi (1725–1783) was an Italian poet, writer and dramatist of some importance in the European literary, cultural and theatrical scene.

He was a counselor of the Court in Berlin and was the author of a summary in French of the monumental History of Italian literature of Girolamo Tiraboschi.

Biography 
He born in Livorno in 1725 and appointed an abbot in 1765. He preached in the collegiate church of Andrew the Apostle in Empoli, but his "immoral" lifestyle   won him a rebuke from the Church, and he eventually abandoned the cassock.

He then moved to Berlin in the service of the emperor Frederick II of Prussia, on the recommendation of the Grand Duke of Tuscany, with the task of composing and adapting stage works for its theater. He also became a court counselor.

At the court in Berlin he was the author of librettos, plays and some historical and literary works such as the Histoire de la littérature d'Italie, an abridged French translation of Tiraboschi, and a history of the Saxon emperors, published in German. He died in Berlin in 1783.

Works

Plays
 L’Aspasia. tragedia d’Inanto Lanido Acc. Ap. All’illustriss. Signora Victoria Gaetani Borgherini, Florence, Anton Giuseppe Pagani, 1761
 Il Rodrigo tragedia dell'abate Antonio Landi fiorentino dedicata al merito singolare dell'illustriss. signore Giuseppe Riccardi patrizio fiorentino de' marchesi di Chianni, Rivalto, Montevaso, and Apple, Florence, Stamperia Imperiale, 1765
 Amore e Psyche, Berlin, 1767;
 Orestes e Pilade, Berlin, Haude und Spener, 1771;
 Orestes e Pilade, Berlin, Haude und Spener, 1786;
 I Greci in Tauride, Berlin, Haude und Spener, 1772;
 Vorspiel nel Britannico, Berlin, 1772;
 Angelica e Medoro, Berlin, Haude und Spener, 1776;
 Il Rodrigo tragedia dell’abbate Antonio Landi fiorentino, Naples, Per il Flauto Regio Impressore, 1776;

Literary and historical works
 Raccolta di poesie teatrali dell’abate Antonio Landi, Florence, Domenico Marzi e Compagni, 1771
 Des Herrn Abt AL ... Regierungsgeschichte der Fürsten aus dem alten Hause Sachsen, in den Königreichen Italien und Teutschland und in dem Kaiserthume. Aus der Italienischen Handschrift übersetzt von J.A. Mebes, Berlin, 1784;
 Histoire de la littérature d'Italie, tirée de l'italien de Mr. Tiraboschi, et abregée par Antoine Landi , Bern, 1784;

Translations
 Storia della letteratura italiana del cavaliere abate Girolamo Tiraboschi compendiata in lingua francese da Antonio Landi ... ed ora tradotta in lingua italiana dal p. G.A.M. ... con annotazioni sopra tutti gl'italiani traduttori de' classici autori latini ec. ec. Venice, Adolfo Cesare e Antonio Rosa, 1801-1805.

References

Other sources 
  Biographical Index Italian  (IBI) by Tommaso Nappo - Paul Noto, III, Monaco - London - New York - Parigu, KG Saur, 1993, p. 803
 Compositions poetry in praise of the very lapels. Mr Abbot Antonio Landi Florentine Lent in the year 1765 with great applause preached nell'insigne Collegiate of St. Andrew of the land of Empoli , Florence, Imperial Printing House, 1765;
 Jocher Christian Gottlieb,  Landi (Anton ), say in  Allgemeines Gelehrten-Lexicon. Adelung , Johann Christoph (from Bd. 3 Rotermund, Heinrich Wilhelm), III, Leipzig - Delmenhorst - Bremen, Johann Friedrich In Gledischens Handlung, 1810, p. 156;
 Gaetano Melzi,  INANTO LANIDO , say in  Dictionary of anonymous and pseudonymous writers or Italian as it is with regard to Italy Gaetano Melzi , II, Milan, Arnaldo Forni Editore, 1852, p . 26;
 Natali Giulio,  Literary history of Italy , I, Milan, Vallardi Publishing House, 1973, pp. 50; 386-387;
 Amos Parducci,  The Italian classic tragedy of the eighteenth century: Front Alfieri , Rocca San Casciano, Licinio Cappelli, 1902, pp. 269; 294; 354;
 Pera Francesco,  Memoirs and biographies Livorno , Livorno, Vigo, 1867, p.220;
 Claudio Sartori,  The books printed from its origins to 1800. Catalog analytical indexes with 16 , Indexes I, Cuneo, Bertola & Locatelli Publishers, p. 278;
 Carlo Schmidl,  Antonio Landi , say in  Universal Dictionary of the musicians ''. By Carlo Schmidl, IIa, Milan, Sonzogno, 1938, p. 445.

External links 
 Italian Biographical Archive (ABI) on line
  Operon. Bühnenwerke mit Musik  

1725 births
1783 deaths
Italian poets
Italian male poets
People from Livorno